The 2018 Kelly Cup playoffs of the ECHL began in April 2018 following the conclusion of the 2017–18 ECHL regular season. The Kelly Cup was won by the Colorado Eagles, in their last season in the ECHL before joining the American Hockey League, in seven games over the regular season champions, the Florida Everblades.

Playoff format
At the end of the regular season the top four teams in each division qualifies for the 2018 Kelly Cup playoffs and be seeded one through four based on highest point total earned in the season. Then the first two rounds of the playoffs are held within the division with the first seed facing the fourth seed and the second seed facing the third. The division champions then play each other in a conference championship. The Kelly Cup finals pits the Eastern Conference champion against the Western Conference champion.  All four rounds are a best-of-seven format.

Playoff seeds
After the regular season, 16 teams qualify for the playoffs. The Florida Everblades were the first team to qualify during the regular season on February 28. The Everblades were the Eastern Conference regular season champions and clinched the Brabham Cup with the best record in the ECHL on April 5. The Toledo Walleye earned the top seed in the Western Conference.

Final seeds

Eastern Conference

North Division
Adirondack Thunder – Division champions, 89 pts
Manchester Monarchs – 88 pts
Reading Royals – 87 pts
Worcester Railers – 82 pts

South Division
Florida Everblades – Brabham Cup winners, division champions, 112 pts
South Carolina Stingrays – 104 pts
Orlando Solar Bears – 75 pts
Atlanta Gladiators – 69 pts

Western Conference

Central Division
Toledo Walleye – Division champions, 105 pts
Fort Wayne Komets – 98 pts
Cincinnati Cyclones – 81 pts
Indy Fuel – 78 pts

Mountain Division
Colorado Eagles – Division champions, 102 pts
Idaho Steelheads – 96 pts
Allen Americans – 78 pts
Wichita Thunder – 76 pts

Playoff bracket

Division semifinals

North Division

(1) Adirondack Thunder vs. (4) Worcester Railers

(2) Manchester Monarchs vs. (3) Reading Royals

South Division

(1) Florida Everblades vs. (4) Atlanta Gladiators

(2) South Carolina Stingrays vs. (3) Orlando Solar Bears

Central Division

(1) Toledo Walleye vs. (4) Indy Fuel

(2) Fort Wayne Komets vs. (3) Cincinnati Cyclones

Mountain Division

(1) Colorado Eagles vs. (4) Wichita Thunder

(2) Idaho Steelheads vs. (3) Allen Americans

Division finals

North Division

(N1) Adirondack Thunder vs. (N2) Manchester Monarchs

South Division

(S1) Florida Everblades vs. (S3) Orlando Solar Bears

Central Division

(C1) Toledo Walleye vs. (C2) Fort Wayne Komets

Mountain Division

(M1) Colorado Eagles vs. (M2) Idaho Steelheads

Conference finals

Eastern Conference

(S1) Florida Everblades vs. (N1) Adirondack Thunder

Western Conference

(M1) Colorado Eagles vs. (C2) Fort Wayne Komets

Kelly Cup finals

(S1) Florida Everblades vs. (M1) Colorado Eagles

Statistical leaders

Skaters
These are the top ten skaters based on points.

''GP = Games played; G = Goals; A = Assists; Pts = Points; +/– = Plus/minus; PIM = Penalty minutes

Goaltending

This is a combined table of the top five goaltenders based on goals against average and the top five goaltenders based on save percentage, with at least 240 minutes played. The table is sorted by GAA, and the criteria for inclusion are bolded.

GP = Games played; W = Wins; L = Losses; OTL = Overtime Losses; SA = Shots against; GA = Goals against; GAA = Goals against average; SV% = Save percentage; SO = Shutouts; TOI = Time on ice (in minutes)

See also 
 2017–18 ECHL season
 List of ECHL seasons

References

External links
ECHL website

Kelly Cup playoffs
2017–18 ECHL season